A mathematical object is an abstract concept arising in mathematics.
In the usual language of mathematics, an object is anything that has been (or could be) formally defined, and with which one may do deductive reasoning and mathematical proofs. Typically, a mathematical object can be a value that can be assigned to a variable, and therefore can be involved in formulas. Commonly encountered mathematical objects include numbers, sets, functions, expressions, geometric objects, transformations of other mathematical objects, and spaces. Mathematical objects can be very complex; for example, theorems, proofs, and even theories are considered as mathematical objects in proof theory.

The ontological status of mathematical objects has been the subject of much investigation and debate by philosophers of mathematics.

List of mathematical objects by branch
 Number theory
 numbers, operations
 Combinatorics
permutations, derangements, combinations
 Set theory
sets, set partitions
functions, and relations
 Geometry
points, lines, line segments,
polygons (triangles, squares, pentagons, hexagons, ...), circles, ellipses, parabolas, hyperbolas,
polyhedra (tetrahedrons, cubes, octahedrons, dodecahedrons, icosahedrons), spheres, ellipsoids, paraboloids, hyperboloids, cylinders, cones.
 Graph theory
graphs, trees, nodes, edges
 Topology
topological spaces and manifolds.
 Linear algebra
scalars, vectors, matrices, tensors.
 Abstract algebra
groups,
rings, modules,
fields, vector spaces,
group-theoretic lattices, and order-theoretic lattices.

Categories are simultaneously homes to mathematical objects and mathematical objects in their own right. In proof theory, proofs and theorems are also mathematical objects.

See also
 Abstract object
 Mathematical structure

References
 Azzouni, J., 1994. Metaphysical Myths, Mathematical Practice. Cambridge University Press.
 Burgess, John, and Rosen, Gideon, 1997. A Subject with No Object. Oxford Univ. Press.
 Davis, Philip and Reuben Hersh, 1999 [1981]. The Mathematical Experience. Mariner Books: 156–62.
 Gold, Bonnie, and Simons, Roger A., 2011. Proof and Other Dilemmas: Mathematics and Philosophy. Mathematical Association of America.
 Hersh, Reuben, 1997. What is Mathematics, Really?  Oxford University Press. 
 Sfard, A., 2000, "Symbolizing mathematical reality into being,  Or how mathematical discourse and mathematical objects create each other," in Cobb, P., et al., Symbolizing and communicating in mathematics classrooms:  Perspectives on discourse, tools and instructional design. Lawrence Erlbaum. 
 Stewart Shapiro, 2000. Thinking about mathematics: The philosophy of mathematics.  Oxford University Press.

External links

Stanford Encyclopedia of Philosophy: "Abstract Objects"—by Gideon Rosen.
Wells, Charles, "Mathematical Objects."
AMOF: The Amazing Mathematical Object Factory
Mathematical Object Exhibit